Cymothoa is a genus of parasitic isopod crustaceans, containing the species listed below. Not all Cymothoa species are considered parasitic. Some climb onto fish in an act known as phoresy. 
Cymothoa asymmetrica Pillai, 1954
Cymothoa borbonica Schiödte & Meinert, 1884
Cymothoa brasiliensis Schiödte & Meinert, 1884
Cymothoa bychowskyi Avdeev, 1979
Cymothoa carangii Avdeev, 1979
Cymothoa carryensis Gourret, 1892
Cymothoa catarinensis Thatcher, Loyola e Silva, Jost & Souza-Conceiçao, 2003
Cymothoa cinerea Bal & Joshi, 1959
Cymothoa curta Schiödte & Meinert, 1884
Cymothoa dufresni Leach, 1818
Cymothoa elegans Bovallius, 1885
Cymothoa epimerica Avdeev, 1979
Cymothoa eremita (Brunnich, 1783)
Cymothoa excisa Perty, 1833
Cymothoa exigua Schiödte & Meinert, 1884
Cymothoa eximia Schiödte & Meinert, 1884
Cymothoa frontalis H. Milne-Edwards, 1840
Cymothoa gadorum Brocchi, 1875
Cymothoa gerris Schiödte & Meinert, 1884
Cymothoa gibbosa Gourret, 1892
Cymothoa globosa Schiödte & Meinert, 1884
Cymothoa guadeloupensis Fabricius, 1793
Cymothoa hermani Hadfield, Bruce & Smit, 2011
Cymothoa ianuarii Schiödte & Meinert, 1884
Cymothoa ichtiola (Brünnich, 1764)
Cymothoa indica Schiödte & Meinert, 1884
Cymothoa liannae Sartor & Pires, 1988
Cymothoa limbata Schiödte & Meinert, 1884
Cymothoa marginata Bleeker, 1857
Cymothoa nigropunctata Risso, 1816
Cymothoa oestrum (Linnaeus, 1758)
Cymothoa paradoxa Haller, 1880
Cymothoa parupenei Avdeev, 1979
Cymothoa plebeia Schiödte & Meinert, 1884
Cymothoa propria Avdeev, 1979
Cymothoa pulchrum Lanchester, 1902
Cymothoa recifea Thatcher & Fonseca, 2005
Cymothoa recta Dana, 1853
Cymothoa rhina Schiödte & Meinert, 1884
Cymothoa rotunda Avdeev, 1979
Cymothoa rotundifrons Haller, 1880
Cymothoa scopulorum (Linnaeus, 1758)
Cymothoa selari Avdeev, 1978
Cymothoa slusarskii Rokicki, 1986
Cymothoa spinipalpa Thatcher, de Arujo, de Lima & Chellapa, 2007
Cymothoa truncata Schiödte & Meinert, 1884
Cymothoa vicina Hale, 1926

References

Cymothoida